State Route 262 (SR 262) is a primary state highway in the U.S. state of Virginia. Known as Woodrow Wilson Parkway or the Staunton Beltway, the state highway runs  from Interstate 64 (I-64) and I-81 near Jolivue west, north, and east in a clockwise loop to SR 254 east of Staunton. SR 262 is a three-quarter circumferential highway around Staunton and adjacent portions of Augusta County. The highway contains two- and four-lane freeway and controlled-access segments and interchanges with several major highways, including U.S. Route 11 (US 11), SR 252, and SR 254 south of Staunton, US 250 on the west side of the city, and I-81 east of Staunton.

Route description

SR 262 begins at a trumpet interchange with I-64 and I-81 a short distance south of where the Interstates diverge to head toward Richmond and Winchester, respectively. The state highway heads northwest as a four-lane freeway that meets US 11 (Greenville Avenue) at a partial cloverleaf interchange at the north end of Jolivue. West of its partial cloverleaf interchange with SR 613 (Old Greenville Road), SR 262 becomes a two-lane undivided freeway on a four-lane right-of-way. The state highway has a partial cloverleaf interchange with SR 252 (Middlebrook Avenue), after which the freeway follows the boundary between Augusta County and the independent city of Staunton. SR 262 curves north, crosses CSX's North Mountain Subdivision, and has diamond interchanges with SR 254 (Parkersburg Turnpike) and SR 720 (Morris Mill Road).

SR 262 enters the city of Staunton shortly before its diamond interchange with US 250 (Churchville Avenue), where the freeway ends and the highway begins to run concurrently with US 250 Truck. The highways head east through at-grade uncontrolled intersections with SR 742 (Shutterlee Mill Road) and SR 613 (Spring Hill Road). US 250 Truck diverges from SR 262 at its intersection with US 11 (Commerce Road). The state highway continues southeast through a grade crossing of the Chesapeake Western Railway and expands to a four-lane divided highway just west of SR F-224, which is used to access a country club to the north. SR 262 leaves Staunton and re-enters Augusta County just west of its diamond interchange with I-81. The state highway reduces to two lanes before reaching its northern terminus at SR 254, which heads southwest toward Staunton as New Hope Road and east toward Waynesboro as Hermitage Road.

Major intersections

References

External links

Virginia Highways Project: VA 262

262
State Route 262
State Route 262